Wendell "C. J." Williams Jr. (born February 6, 1990) is an American professional basketball player for Élan Béarnais of the LNB Pro A. He played college basketball for North Carolina State.

High school career
Williams attended Jack Britt High School under Ike Walker. As a senior, he averaged 15.7 points, 7.0 rebounds and 3.5 assists, leading his team to a 27–5 record and the state 4-A semifinals. For that, he was named the Cape Fear Region Player of the Year by the Fayetteville Observer and was a second-team all-state selection and was a two-time Mid Southeastern Conference Player of the Year. When he graduated, he was ranked as the No. 25 small forward by Rivals.com.

College career
Williams played four years at North Carolina State. In 37 games as a senior, he averaged 10.6 points, 3.8 rebounds, 1.8 assists and 1.1 steals in 31.1 minutes and helped the Wolfpack reach the NCAA Tournament's Sweet 16.

Professional career

ETHA Engomis (2012–2013)
After going undrafted in the 2012 NBA draft, Williams signed with ETHA Engomis of the Cypriot League on July 24, 2012. In 29 games, he averaged 13.5 points, 3.5 rebounds, 1.9 assists and 1.5 steals.

Los Angeles D-Fenders (2013–2014)
On November 1, 2013, Williams signed with the Los Angeles D-Fenders of the NBA Development League. In 49 games, he averaged 14.4 points, 4.6 rebounds, 2 assists and 1.2 steals.

Pistoia Basket 2000 (2014–2015)
After joining the Milwaukee Bucks for the 2014 NBA Summer League, Williams signed with Giorgio Tesi Group Pistoia of the Italian Serie A on August 11, 2014. In 30 games, he averaged 14.4 points, 4.2 rebounds, 2.1 assists, 0.9 steals and 0.7 blocks.

JDA Dijon Basket (2015–2016)
After joining the Minnesota Timberwolves for the 2015 NBA Summer League, Williams signed with JDA Dijon Basket of the French League on July 22, 2015. In 34 games, he averaged 11.9 points, 2.7 rebounds, 1.5 assists and 1 steal.

Texas Legends (2016–2017)
In July 2016, Williams joined the San Antonio Spurs for the 2016 NBA Summer League. On September 19, he signed with the Dallas Mavericks, but was waived on October 22 after appearing in five preseason games. On October 30, 2016, he was acquired by the Texas Legends of the NBA Development League as an affiliate player of the Mavericks.

Los Angeles Clippers (2017–2018)
On September 27, 2017, Williams signed with the Los Angeles Clippers. His training camp deal would later be upgraded into a two-way contract on October 14, 2017, meaning he can officially split playing time between the Los Angeles Clippers and their G League affiliate, the Agua Caliente Clippers. On January 8, 2018 Williams scored 15 points against to defeat the Atlanta Hawks 108–107. Williams made a game winning three-point shot with 9.1 seconds remaining. On April 9, 2018, Williams was reported to have re-signed with the Los Angeles Clippers to a multi-year deal. On April 11, he was named the recipient of the 2018 NBA G League's Jason Collier Sportsmanship Award. On July 27, 2018, the Clippers waived Williams.

Minnesota Timberwolves (2018–2019)
On July 31, 2018, the Minnesota Timberwolves signed Williams to a two-way contract with the Iowa Wolves of the NBA G League.

Long Island Nets (2019–2020)
On September 25, 2019, Williams signed a non-guaranteed deal with the Brooklyn Nets, and was waived on October 18. He then landed with the Long Island Nets.

Élan Béarnais (2021)
On February 18, 2021, he signed with Élan Béarnais of the French LNB Pro A.

Yalovaspor (2021–2022)
On August 10, 2021, he signed with Semt77 Yalovaspor of the Turkish Basketball Super League.

Ironi Ness Ziona (2022–present)
On July 17, 2022, he signed with Ironi Ness Ziona of the Israeli Basketball Super League.

National team career
Williams played with the senior United States national team at the 2017 FIBA AmeriCup, where he won a gold medal.

Personal life
Williams' father played baseball in college at Florida A&M. Williams majored in Business Administration - Human Resources.

NBA career statistics

Regular season

|-
| style="text-align:left;"|
| style="text-align:left;"|L.A. Clippers
| 38 || 17 || 18.6 || .442 || .282 || .813 || 1.5 || 1.1 || .8 || .3 || 5.5
|-
| style="text-align:left;"|
| style="text-align:left;"|Minnesota
| 15 || 0 || 8.5 || .486 || .313 || .000 || .5 || .8 || .4 || .0 || 2.6
|- class="sortbottom"
| style="text-align:center;" colspan="2"|Career
| 53 || 17 || 15.8 || .448 || .287 || .765 || 1.2 || 1.0 || .7 || .2 || 4.7

References

External links
 NC State Wolfpack bio
 College stats @ sports-reference.com

1990 births
Living people
Agua Caliente Clippers players
American expatriate basketball people in Cyprus
American expatriate basketball people in France
American expatriate basketball people in Italy
American men's basketball players
Basketball players from North Carolina
Iowa Wolves players
Ironi Nes Ziona B.C. players
JDA Dijon Basket players
Long Island Nets players
Los Angeles Clippers players
Los Angeles D-Fenders players
Minnesota Timberwolves players
NC State Wolfpack men's basketball players
Pistoia Basket 2000 players
Shooting guards
Sportspeople from Fayetteville, North Carolina
Texas Legends players
Undrafted National Basketball Association players
United States men's national basketball team players
Yalovaspor BK players